One Last Kiss is an extended play by Japanese musician Hikaru Utada, which was released in the US on March 9, 2021. It was released for promotion of the Japanese animated film Evangelion: 3.0+1.0 Thrice Upon a Time around the time of the film's release. It contains all the previously released theme songs that were made for the Rebuild of Evangelion film series. It also contains the theme song "One Last Kiss", which was co-produced by A. G. Cook and released in conjunction with the film on March 10, 2021. 

Commercially, the EP debuted at number two on the Oricon Albums Chart, and at number one on the combined physical and digital Oricon albums chart as well as the Billboard Japan Hot Albums chart.

Background and history 
"Beautiful World" debuted on the radio and was released as a ringtone on July 23, 2007, and after as a physical single on August 29, 2007. In early September, Utada performed the song at many music entertainment programs in Japan: at Count Down TV on the night of September 1, Hey! Hey! Hey! Music Champ on September 3, Utaban on September 6, and both Music Station and Music Fighter on September 7. "Beautiful World" was performed during Utada's two date concert series Wild Life in December 2010.

In 2009, the song was rearranged by Russel McNamara for the second film of the Rebuild of Evangelion series, as "Beautiful World (Planitb Acoustica Mix)". It was released as a digital download on June 28, 2009. The song was commercially successful, reaching number 8 on the Billboard Japan Hot 100. It first appeared as the final track of their second compilation album Utada Hikaru Single Collection Vol. 2.

Utada wrote "Sakura Nagashi" at the express interest of the staff for the Evangelion movie series. Although on hiatus at the time, Utada wrote and composed the song due to their appreciation of the movie series; they had also composed the themes for the previous two Evangelion films. "Sakura Nagashi" is a J-pop/piano rock song, composed of piano and strings, and in the latter part of the song drums, guitar and synths.  It was written by Utada and British songwriter Paul Carter. The song plays at the very end of the film Evangelion: 3.0+1.0 Thrice Upon a Time, as the camera pans out of Ube Station and towards the town of Ube, Yamaguchi.

Title track and release 
"One Last Kiss" was written and composed by Utada, and produced by Utada and English PC Music producer A. G. Cook. The music video of the song was directed by Neon Genesis Evangelion director Hideaki Anno, giving a glimpse of Utada's personal life in the United Kingdom. Critics noted the bittersweet tone of the song resembles much of their earlier work such as Ultra Blue and Heart Station.

On March 9, 2021, it was revealed "One Last Kiss" would receive a physical release internationally. This was organised due to large demand from overseas. The cover features the character Asuka from the film series. It was released in 4 versions: 3 North American versions released in August 20 and a European version released in October 22.

Track listing

Personnel 
Credits are adapted from the EP's liner notes. 

 Hikaru Utada - writer, producer, vocals recording (track 1, 2), vocals (track 1, 2, 3, 5, 6), keyboard (track 1, 2, 3), programming (track 1, 2, 3, 5), arranger (track 3), music (track 5), string arrangement (track 5)
 A.G. Cook - co-producer (track 1)
 Steve Fitzmaurice - recording (tracks 1-2), mixing (tracks 1-2)
 Yuya Saito - vocals editing (tracks 1-2)
 Jodi Milliner - synth bass (track 1), bass (track 2)
 Nariaki Obukuro - producer (track 2), vocals recording (track 2), keyboard (track 2), programming (track 2)
 Masahito Komori - strings recording (track 2)
 Ben Parker - acoustic guitar (track 2)
 Reuben James - piano (track 2)
 Nobuaki Tanaka - additional programming (track 2)
 Yuta Bando - string arrangement (track 2), conductor (track 2)
 Ensemble FOVE - strings (track 2)
 Akira Miyake - producer (track 3, 6)
 Teruzane Skingg Utada - producer (track 3, 6)
 Atsushi Matsui - recording (track 3, 5)
 Goetz B. - mixing (track 3, 5-6)
 Yuzuru Tomita - additional programming (track 3)
 Alexis Smith - additional programming (track 3)
 Russell McNamara - producer (track 4), programming (track 4), guitar (track 4)
 Dan Reynolds - drums (track 4)
 Paul Carter - music (track 5), piano (track 5), programming (track 5), string arrangement (track 5)
 Kei Kawano - band leader (track 5), conductor (track 5-6), string arrangement (track 5-6), arranger (track 6), keyboard (track 6), programming (track 6), 
 Takumi Ogasawara - drums (track 5)
 Takeshi Taneda - electric bass (track 5)
 Tsuyoshi Kon - electric guitar (track 5)
 Mamiko Amemiya - strings leader (track 5)
 Bart Howard - words (track 6), music (track 6)
 Masaaki Ugajin - recording (track 6)
 Goh Hotoda - strings recording (track 6)
 Takahiro Iida - Synthesizer Programming (track 6)
 Hironori Akiyama - guitar (track 6)
 Yuichiro Goto - strings (track 6)
 Randy Merrill - mastering (all tracks)
 Atsushi Nishigori - key frame for "EVANGELION:3.0+1.0"
 Masashi Ichifuru - art director, design

Charts

Sales and certifications

Release history

References

External links
One Last Kiss on Hikaru Utada's official web site

Hikaru Utada albums
2021 EPs
Hikaru Utada compilation albums
Japanese-language EPs
Sony Music Entertainment Japan albums
Epic Records soundtracks
Sony Music soundtracks
Milan Records soundtracks
Milan Records albums
Neon Genesis Evangelion
Anime soundtracks
Albums produced by A. G. Cook